Heteroteucha parvula is a moth of the family Oecophoridae. It is found in Australia, where it has been recorded from Queensland, New South Wales, the Australian Capital Territory, Victoria, Tasmania and South Australia.

The wingspan is about 15 mm.

The larvae feed on the leaves of Leptospermum species.

References

Moths described in 1884
Heteroteucha